= Sristi TV =

- Country: India
- Headquarters: Kolkata, West Bengal, India

Programming
- Language(s): Bengali

History
- Launched: 1 January 2005

Sristi TV is a 24-hour Bengali entertainment channel launched on 1 January 2005. The channel broadcasts entertainment programs in Bangla.
